Craik Forest is a forest near Hawick in the Scottish Borders area of Scotland, and managed by the Forestry Commission. It is adjoined to the south-west by Eskdalemuir Forest.

See also
Craik, Scottish Borders
Ettrick Forest
Wauchope Forest
List of forests in the United Kingdom
List of places in the Scottish Borders
List of places in Scotland

External links
RCAHMS/Canmore record for Wolfcleuchhead, Craik Forest
Forestry commission: Craik Forest
Gazetteer for Scotland, map of Craik Forest
Images of Craik Forest
GEOGRAPH image: Observation hide in Craik Forest
GEOGRAPH image: Forestry track, Craik Forest
Red Squirrels at Craik Forest
Craikhope Outdoor Centre, owned by Scottish Borders Council

Forests and woodlands of Scotland
Geography of the Scottish Borders